Vimicro Corporation  is a Chinese fabless chip company which specializes in research and development and production and marketing of multimedia processors for personal computers (PCs) and mobile phones. It is headquartered in Haidian District, Beijing, China. It was founded in 1999 when the Chinese government invited a group of Chinese people who had been educated and had established careers in Silicon Valley to return to China to start a company. It was the first Chinese chip design company with proprietary technology to be listed on NASDAQ.

References

External links

 The company's website

Fabless semiconductor companies
Semiconductor companies of China